{{Infobox legislature
| background_color = Green
| name          = National Assembly
| native_name = 
| legislature   = 27th Parliament (members)
| coa_pic        = 
| coa_caption    = Logo of the Parliament of the Republic of South Africa
| coa_res        = 200px
| session_room  = National Assembly of South Africa 2007.jpg
| house_type    = Lower house
| body          = Parliament of South Africa
| leader1_type  = Speaker
| leader1       = Nosiviwe Mapisa-Nqakula
| party1        = ANC
| election1     = 19 August 2021
| leader2_type  = Deputy Speaker
| leader2       = Solomon Lechesa Tsenoli
| party2        = ANC
| election2     = 21 May 2014
| leader3_type  = Leader of Government Business
| leader3       = Paul Mashatile
| party3        = ANC
| election3     = 7 March 2023
| leader4_type  = Chief Whip of the Majority Party
| leader4       = Pemmy Majodina
| party4        = ANC
| election4     = 22 May 2019
| leader5_type  = Leader of the Opposition
| leader5       = John Steenhuisen 
| party5        =  DA
| election5     = 27 October 2019
| leader6_type  = Chief Whip of the Opposition
| leader6       = Siviwe Gwarube
| party6        = DA
| election6     = 18 August 2022
| structure1    = Diagram of the National Assembly of South Africa.svg
| structure1_res = 260px
| members       = 400
| political_groups1= 
 Government  (230)
 ANC (230)
 Official Opposition  (84)
 DA (84)
 Other parties (86)
 EFF (44)
 IFP (14)
 FF+ (10)
 ACDP (4)
 UDM (2)
 ATM (2)
 Good (2)
 NFP (2)
 AIC (2)
 COPE (2)
 PAC (1)
 Al Jama-ah (1)
| voting_system1 = Closed list proportional representation
| last_election1 = 8 May 2019
| next_election1 = 2024
| meeting_place = Good Hope Chamber, Cape Town, South Africa
| website       = 
}}

The National Assembly' is the directly elected house of the Parliament of South Africa, located in Cape Town, Western Cape. It consists of four hundred members who are elected every five years using a party-list proportional representation system where half of the members are elected proportionally from nine provincial lists and the remaining half from national lists so as to restore proportionality.

The National Assembly is presided over by a Speaker, assisted by a Deputy Speaker. The current Speaker is Nosiviwe Mapisa-Nqakula who previously served as the Minister of Defence and Military Veterans. She was elected on 19 August 2021. The Deputy Speaker is Solomon Lechesa Tsenoli who has served in the post since his election on 21 May 2014.Thandi Modise elected National Assembly Speaker, Tsenoli returns as her deputy. Retrieved on 22 May 2019.

The National Assembly chamber was destroyed in a fire in January 2022. National Assembly sittings will now be held in the old Good Hope Chamber, which is within the precincts of parliament.

Allocation
The National Assembly seats are allocated using a proportional representation system with closed lists. Seats are first allocated according to the (integer part of the) Droop quota. Thereafter at most five seats are allocated using the largest remainder method (using the Droop quota). Any additional seats are allocated amongst the parties who then already have seats using the highest averages method.

Voters have one vote at elections to the National Assembly. Seats are allocated in ten multi-member constituencies via party lists. One constituency is a national or 'at large' constituency and nine others represent each of the nine provinces. The lists were called the national lists and regional lists in the 2009 election. 'Regional' was used to avoid confusion with the provincial legislature elections held at the same time. Previously they were called 'National to National' and 'Provincial to National'.

Of the 400 members of the National Assembly, half are assigned to be elected from national lists and the remaining half are assigned to be elected from regional lists. Every election, the Independent Electoral Commission (IEC) determines the allocation of the 200 regional list seats to each province by population.

Parties decide whether they want to set up both national and regional lists or only regional lists. In the 2009 election, the Democratic Alliance (DA) chose not to use a national list. The nationwide votes entitled the DA to 67 seats, but the provincial votes amounted to only 35 seats. While normally the remaining 32 members would be drawn from the party's national list, in this case the remaining seats were distributed among the other DA regional list candidates. This resulted in the National Assembly being made up of 168 members elected on national lists and 232 members elected on regional lists.

History

The National Assembly was first elected in South Africa's first non-racial election in 1994 with the African National Congress (ANC) winning 252 of the 400 seats. The National Party (NP), the previous governing party, won 82 seats, and the Inkatha Freedom Party (IFP) won 43. Under the terms of the Interim Constitution this result entitled the NP and the IFP to take part in the Government of National Unity alongside the ANC, and gave the ANC and NP the right to each nominate one Deputy President. The other parties represented in the assembly were the Freedom Front (9 seats), the Democratic Party (7 seats), the Pan Africanist Congress (5 seats), and the African Christian Democratic Party (2 seats).

In the election of 1999, the ANC won 266 seats, one short of the two-thirds majority needed to unilaterally amend the constitution. The DP expanded its representation to become the official opposition with 38 seats, while the IFP won 34. The NP, now renamed the New National Party (NNP), dropped to 28 seats, and the newly formed United Democratic Movement (UDM) won 14. Eight smaller parties also obtained seats in the assembly.

In the election of 2004 the ANC obtained 279 seats, gaining a two-thirds majority and the ability to change the constitution. The DP became the Democratic Alliance (DA) and remained the official opposition with 50 seats, while the IFP won 28 seats. The NNP was severely weakened, obtaining only 7 seats; the party was formally disbanded in 2005 with the majority of the party joining the ANC.

In the election of 2009 the ANC lost its two-thirds majority but remained the majority party with 264 seats. The DA increased its support to 67 seats, and the new Congress of the People (COPE) party, a breakaway from the ANC, obtained 30 seats. The IFP was reduced to 18 seats.

In the election of 2014 the ANC lost further seats, but remained the majority party with 249 seats. The DA increased its support to 89 seats, while the Economic Freedom Fighters (EFF), a far-left breakaway from the ANC, obtained 25 seats. The IFP further reduced to 10 seats while COPE's influence was strongly reduced, only electing three MPs.

In the election of 2019 the ANC lost even more seats, but remained the majority party with a seat total of 230 seats. The Official Opposition DA declined from 89 seats to 84 seats. The EFF increased its seat total to 44 seats. The IFP managed to arrest the decline in its support and obtained 14 seats. The Freedom Front Plus (FF+) grew to 10 seats, a gain of 6 seats. Nine other parties obtained seats.

The following table shows the party composition of the National Assembly over time:

 Election results 
The last election was held on 8 May 2019.

Current composition

|-style="background:#e9e9e9;"
!colspan="2" style="text-align:left"| Party !! style="text-align:center"| Seats !! %
|-
|  || 230 || 57.5
|-
|  || 84 || 21
|-
|  || 44 || 11
|-
|  || 14 || 3.5
|-
|  || 10 || 2.5
|-
|  || 4 || 1
|-
|  || 2 || 0.5
|-
|  || 2 || 0.5
|-
|  || 2 || 0.5
|-
|  || 2 || 0.5
|-
|  || 2 || 0.5
|-
|  || 2 || 0.5
|-
|  || 1 || 0.25
|-
|  || 1 || 0.25
|-
|colspan="2" style="text-align:left"| Total || style="text-align:right"| 400 || 100.00
|}

 Salaries of members of the National Assembly 

 Annual monetary remuneration 
As of 2019, the highest earning members of the National Assembly are the Speaker of the National Assembly and the deputy president of the Republic of South Africa, who is the head of the executive government's representatives in the National Assembly. They each earn an annual salary of R2,825,470.

The second highest earning members of the National Assembly are Members of Parliament (MP) who are also cabinet ministers. They earn an annual salary of R2,401,633

The Deputy Speaker earns an annual salary of R1,977,795. This is also the salary of deputy cabinet ministers.

Senior MPs, such as the leader of the opposition and chief whips of each party, earn an annual salary of R1,600,467.

MPs who chair committees earn an annual salary of R1,405,015.

Leaders of minority parties earn R1,309,563.

Regular MPs earn R1,106,940.

 Other benefits 

 88 domestic journeys per year which can either be by air, train, bus or vehicle.
 Transport to and from South African airports.
 Parking at South African airports.
 Transport of dependents.
 Relocation costs.
 "Tools of trade", which include mobile phones, tablets and laptops.
 Equipment, furniture and stationery for MPs' offices inside the national assembly. 
 Personal accident insurance.
 Accommodation at the parliamentary villages in Cape Town.
 Daily transport to and from the villages to parliament.

According to Business Insider South Africa'', SA MPs are in the top 1% earning bracket in the nation. The lowest earning MP earns a monthly salary of around R92,245. This salary comes while the average South African earned a monthly salary of around R21,432, as of September 2019 and the minimum wage was just R20 per hour.

References

External links
 Parliament of South Africa
 National Assembly

South Africa
Parliament of South Africa